Pseudomonas flavescens is a Gram-negative bacterium that causes blight cankers on walnut trees. Based on 16S rRNA analysis, P. flavescens has been placed in the P. aeruginosa group.

References

External links
 Type strain of Pseudomonas flavescens at BacDive -  the Bacterial Diversity Metadatabase

Pseudomonadales
Bacterial plant pathogens and diseases
Nut tree diseases
Bacteria described in 1994